Isa Sanna Mattiasdotter Tengblad (born 25 April 1998), known professionally as simply Isa (stylized as ISA) is a Swedish singer, songwriter, and producer. She participated in Småstjärnorna, which was broadcast on TV4, where she imitated singer Jill Johnson. She also competed on Talang Sverige in 2009 as a member of the duo Electrified. In the summer of 2012, she released the single "Bomb". She performed the song at Sommarkrysset the same year. In 2014 she released the single "What Are We".

Tengblad participated in Melodifestivalen 2015 with the song "Don't Stop" in the competition's third semi-final. She made it to the final in Friends Arena finishing 7th overall. In May 2015, she participated as a member of the Swedish jury in the Eurovision Song Contest 2015. She also took part in Melodifestivalen 2016 with "I Will Wait", where she advanced to the Second Chance after placing 3rd in her semi final, but did not qualify for the Final.

After competing in Melodifestivalen, she released numerous singles under her own independent label, Licious Music. Her 2018 single "Perfect" was streamed over 2 million times on Spotify and she released her debut album (titled "Debut Album") on 24 May 2019.

Tengblad is an active songwriter, having co-written "You" released by Charlie Who? with over 18 million streams (2017), "I Love It Loud" released by Dutch vlogger Djamila (2018), and "27 Sorries" released by Peg Parnevik (2019). She also co-wrote Malou Prytz's Melodifestivalen 2019 entry "I Do Me", which placed 2nd in the second semi-final and qualified directly to the final where it placed 12th.

She released her single "Who the Hell" on 22 November 2019 after partnering with Corite. Her latest single "Walk Like Jesus" was released on 22 May 2020.

Discography

Albums

Singles

References

1998 births
Living people
Swedish pop singers
Swedish singer-songwriters
English-language singers from Sweden
Swedish child singers
Musicians from Stockholm
21st-century Swedish singers
21st-century Swedish women singers
Melodifestivalen contestants of 2016
Melodifestivalen contestants of 2015